Herbert Tutsch (born 9 February 1963) is a German former wrestler. He competed in the men's freestyle 52 kg at the 1988 Summer Olympics.

References

External links
 

1963 births
Living people
German male sport wrestlers
Olympic wrestlers of West Germany
Wrestlers at the 1988 Summer Olympics
People from Schorndorf
Sportspeople from Stuttgart (region)